Avion Ridge is a ridge in Alberta, Canada.

Avion is a name derived from French meaning "airplane".

References

Ridges of Alberta